All Hallows' Catholic College is a Roman Catholic co-educational secondary school and sixth form in Macclesfield in Cheshire, England. It educates approximately 1200 children between 11 and 18 years of age. The college became a voluntary academy on 1 January 2013 replacing the former voluntary aided status, and is supported by its trustees, the Catholic Diocese of Shrewsbury. The school opened as All Hallows' Catholic High School in 1962 and the first head teacher was Mr. William Blackledge, who was followed by Mr. Richard K. Weremczyk. The current principal is Mr. T Beesley. The school was renamed a college following designation as a specialist college for business and enterprise with ethics in 2006. The additional specialism of languages was added in 2010 and the college is now a faith school specialising in Business, Ethical Enterprise and Languages. All Hallows is a National Support School. It is also the National Teacher Effectiveness Enhancement Programme (TEEP) Champion Centre, and is a partner in three Teaching School Alliances.

The college now offers language specialisms in French, Spanish, German, Latin, and Mandarin.

Curriculum
The college follows the National Curriculum with particular emphasis on the expressive arts, sports, and business and enterprise with ethics. Languages specialism was added in 2010 and since 
September 2011 there is the provision for students to learn more than one language. Students can choose from German, Spanish, French, Mandarin and Latin. The college has recently changed the curriculum from the Ofsted graded Outstanding back to the standard key stage system. KS3 (Years 7–9) KS4 (Years 10–11) & KS5 (Years 12–13)

All Hallows' Learning Community 
All Hallows' Learning Community is a partnership of Church schools which work as a closely networked community. In addition to All Hallows Catholic College, the schools involved in the community are:
St Alban's Catholic Primary [Macclesfield]
St Benedict's Catholic Primary [Handforth]
Christ The King Primary School (A joint church school, replacing St Edward's Catholic Primary and St Barnabas' C of E Primary schools) [Macclesfield]
St Gregory's Catholic Primary [Bollington]
St Mary's Catholic Primary [Congleton]
St Paul's Catholic Primary [Poynton]
St John the Evangelist Church of England Primary School [Macclesfield]

The Holy Family of Nazareth Academy Trust was established in January 2013 for schools in the partnership who wish to become voluntary academies.

References

Current OFSTED report

External links
 http://www.dioceseofshrewsbury.org/
 https://web.archive.org/web/20090327055846/http://www.becolleges.coop/colleges.htm
 https://web.archive.org/web/20100527090344/http://awards.becta.org.uk/display.cfm?page=2030
 https://web.archive.org/web/20090411204031/http://www.leadingaspectaward.org.uk/welcome

Secondary schools in the Borough of Cheshire East
Catholic secondary schools in the Diocese of Shrewsbury
Academies in the Borough of Cheshire East